Mircea Ilca (born 25 July 1958) is a Romanian sports shooter. He competed in the mixed 50 metre rifle prone event at the 1980 Summer Olympics.

References

1958 births
Living people
Romanian male sport shooters
Olympic shooters of Romania
Shooters at the 1980 Summer Olympics
Sportspeople from Arad, Romania